James Hayden Fletcher (1835 – April 13, 1917) was an American politician. Between 1889 and 1891 he served as the first Lieutenant Governor of South Dakota.

Life
James Fletcher was born in Charlottetown the capital and largest city of the Canadian province of Prince Edward Island. A son of John Fletcher, whose wife was Miss Moar from New Perth. In 1869 he was editor or the "Island Argus". He moved to Pierre, South Dakota. He eventually settled in the Dakota Territory and became a member of the Republican Party. In 1889 he was elected to the office of the Lieutenant Governor of the newly founded State South Dakota. He served in this position between 1889 and 1891 when his term ended. In this function he was the deputy of Governor Arthur C. Mellette and he presided over the South Dakota Senate. He died in Portland, Oregon on April 13, 1917.

References

https://archive.org/details/skyepioneersthei0000macq Skye Pioneers and "The Island", McQueen, Malcolm Alexander, 1878

External links
 
 The Political Graveyard

1835 births
1917 deaths
Lieutenant Governors of South Dakota
South Dakota Republicans